Blood in the River may refer to:
 "Blood in the River", a song from the 1995 Econoline Crush album Affliction
 "Blood in the River", a song from the 2016 Zeal & Ardor album Devil Is Fine
 "Blood in the River", a song from the 2017 Flobots album Noenemies